David O'Donahue is the Deputy Adjutant General-Civil Support of the Wisconsin National Guard with the rank of Brigadier General.

Career
O'Donahue received his commission through the Reserve Officers' Training Corps in 1987. Commands he has held within the Wisconsin Army National Guard include the 157th Maneuver Enhancement Brigade. In addition, O'Donahue served two combat deployments during the Iraq War.

Awards he has received include the Legion of Merit, Bronze Star Medal with oak leaf cluster, Meritorious Service Medal with three oak leaf clusters and the Army Commendation Medal with four oak leaf clusters.

Education
Michigan Technological University
Trident University International
United States Army War College

References

Military personnel from Milwaukee
National Guard (United States) generals
Wisconsin National Guard personnel
United States Army personnel of the Iraq War
Recipients of the Legion of Merit
Michigan Technological University alumni
United States Army War College alumni
Living people
Year of birth missing (living people)